Isa Yunis oghlu Gambar (Azerbaijani: İsa Yunis oğlu Qəmbər), also known as Isa Gambar (born February 24, 1957), is an Azerbaijani politician and leader of the Equality Party (Müsavat), one of the opposition blocs in Azerbaijan.

Biography details

 1974 	 Finished Baku High School No. 62
 1979 - Graduated from the Faculty of History, Baku State University (BSU)
 1979-1982 - Worked at the Nakhichivan Autonomous Republic Research Center
 1982-1990 - Azerbaijan's Academy of Sciences Researched at the Institute of Oriental Studies
 1989-1991 - Academy of Sciences and one of the founders and leaders of the Popular Front of Azerbaijan (PFA)
 1990-1991 - Deputy chairman of PFA
 1990 - Member of Parliament (MP)
 1991-1992 - Chairman of the Parliamentary Commission on Foreign Relations.
 1992 - Elected baskan (chairman) by the Congress of Restoration Committee of Equality Party (Azerbaijan).
 May 1992 - Elected parliamentary speaker
 June 17, 1992 - Acting president (government title) of the Azerbaijan Republic. Prepared the country for a democratic election
 June 15, 1993 - Resigned after overthrow of the democratically elected president of Azerbaijan
 July 16, 1993 - Arrested by the rebel forces that seized power led by Heydar Aliyev
 1999, 2001-2003 - Co-founder and chairman of the Democratic Congress that included Azerbaijan's leading political parties
 2000 - Awarded the prize "A Friend of Journalists"
 2003 - Single presidential candidate for the opposition electoral bloc “Bizim Azərbaycan” (“Our Azerbaijan”) that associated more than 30 parties.

Gambar is married and has two sons. His wife, Aida Bağırova, is a doctor of history, and a professor at Baku State University.

2003 elections

Human Rights Watch commented on the 2003 elections: 
Human Rights Watch research found that the government had heavily intervened in the elections campaign in favour of Prime Minister İlham Aliyev, son of the current President Heydar Aliyev. The government had stacked the Central Election Commission and local election commission with its supporters, and banned local non-governmental organizations from monitoring the vote. As the elections drew nearer, government officials have openly sided with the campaign of İlham Aliyev, constantly obstructing opposition rallies and attempting to limit public participation in opposition events. In some cases, local officials have closed all the roads into town during opposition rallies, or have extended working and school hours, in one case, even declaring a Sunday work day, to prevent participation in opposition rallies.

2011 protests

In his role as leader of Müsavat, Gambar has played a major part in spring 2011 demonstrations inspired by other protests throughout the Middle East. He and his party have organized protests, occasionally joining with fellow opposition groups like the Popular Front Party to rally in Baku despite a government ban and the steadfast efforts of security forces to disperse gatherings and arrest activists. "There is a criminal, authoritarian and corrupt regime in Azerbaijan, and the people of Azerbaijan no longer want to live under these conditions," Gambar told The New York Times. In early April, Ilkin Gambar, the opposition leader's son currently serving in the Azerbaijani Army, claimed on his Facebook page that he was being sent to the front lines in Azerbaijan's standoff with Armenia and that his father had been "warned" that this could be a result of his continuing involvement in protests. For his part, Isa Gambar said, "The Ministry of Defence has a right to place soldiers in any location at its disposal. So I don't want to politicize this issue."

See also

 Politics of Azerbaijan
 National Assembly of Azerbaijan
 Foreign relations of Azerbaijan
 List of political parties in Azerbaijan

References

 Forrest, Brett (Nov. 28, 2005). "Over A Barrel in Baku". Fortune, pp. 54–60.

External links

 The Organization for Security and Co-operation in Europe's final report (source: HTML format or PDF format ))
 İsa Qəmbər personal web-site with additional information about recent events 
 Opposition Leader in the Interview to AIA: "Iran tries to influence the situation in Azerbaijan"
 The Azerbaijani Elections: İsa Qəmbər — Leader of the Largest Opposition Bloc

1957 births
Living people
Azerbaijani Muslims
Chairmen of the National Assembly (Azerbaijan)
Presidents of Azerbaijan
Politicians from Baku
Azerbaijani democracy activists
Musavat politicians
Baku State University alumni